Clivocampa is a genus of two-pronged bristletails in the family Campodeidae. There is at least one described species in Clivocampa, C. solus.

References

Further reading

 
 
 

Diplura